BibleGateway is a Christian website designed to allow easy reading, listening, studying, searching, and sharing of the Bible in many different versions and translations, including English, French, Spanish, and other languages (see below). Its mission statement is "To honor Christ by equipping people to read and understand the Bible, wherever they are". The website is free to use, but also offers Bible Gateway Plus, a membership program with enhanced services. It is currently owned by Zondervan.

Bible Gateway's engagement features include the ability to display a single bible verse in all English bible translations, the ability to display and compare up to five Bible translations side by side at once; its daily Blog; more than 60 email devotions, Bible reading plans, and verses-of-the-day; an award-winning free mobile app; audio Bibles; video interviews; Bible reference books; shareable widgets; advanced search tools; Bible Gateway Blogger Grid; a retail store; and the Bible Gateway Deals discount program. Bible Gateway's online bookstore offers more than 500,000 Christian resources. It is an affiliate of Christianbook.com.

History 
Founded by Nick Hengeveld in 1993 at Calvin College, Grand Rapids, Michigan, Bible Gateway was initially planned as a static HTML presentation of the Bible. In 1995, the site moved to the new Gospel Communications Network (a part of Gospel Communications International). The Bible Gateway website was originally written as a CGI script in Perl. Later versions were written in C++, PHP and Ruby.

Bible Gateway gradually expanded its database by acquiring the rights to more English and foreign language translations, including translations published by International Bible Society, The Lockman Foundation and Wycliffe Global Alliance.

In late 2008, Zondervan (the Evangelical Christian publisher of the NIV and TNIV Bible and a wholly owned subsidiary of HarperCollins) acquired Bible Gateway from Gospel Communications. The sale of the site came after two years of continued financial difficulties on the part of the donation-driven GospelCom ministry.

In June 2009, Joseph Park was hired as president of BibleGateway.com. Park was co-founder and former CEO of Kozmo.com, which was the subject of the documentary film e-Dreams. He was also co-founder and former CEO of Askville, which was owned by Amazon and closed in 2013.

In May 2010, Rachel Barach replaced Park (who became Senior Vice President of Consumer Products at parent company HarperCollins Digital, Consumer) as General Manager of Bible Gateway.

, Bible Gateway hosts 232 versions of the Bible, in 74 different languages. Its Alexa ranking is #744.

References 

Android (operating system) software
BlackBerry software
Christian websites
Electronic Bibles
Internet properties established in 2008
IOS software
Online Scripture Search Engine
Universal Windows Platform apps
Bible versions and translations
Internet properties established in 1993